Naan Potta Savaal is 1980 Indian Tamil-language Western film directed by Puratchidasan. The film stars Rajinikanth and Reena, with M. R. Radha and M. R. R. Vasu in supporting roles. This is the first film in which the screen credits carried the title "Super Star" for Rajinikanth. It was also the last film of Radha. The film did not do well at the box office. The film was simultaneously shot in Telugu as Idhe Naa Savaal. In Telugu version Rajinikanth, Reena, Pandari Bai, C. L. Anandan, Ceylon Manohar, S. V. Ramadoss and Jayamalini reprise their roles and other roles cast by Telugu actors.

Cast

Soundtrack 

Tamil Songs
Lyrics for the songs were written by film director Puratchidasan himself.

Telugu Songs

References

External links 
 

1980 films
1980 Western (genre) films
1980s Tamil-language films
1980s Telugu-language films
Films scored by Ilaiyaraaja
Indian Western (genre) films
Indian multilingual films